The 57th Berlin International Film Festival was held from 8 to 18 February 2007. The opening film of this year's festival was Olivier Dahan’s La Vie En Rose. Angel by François Ozon served as the closing night film. American director Paul Schrader served as the jury president at the festival.

The Golden Bear was presented to the Chinese film Tuya's Marriage directed by Wang Quan'an. 224,181 tickets of the festival were sold. The festival held a Retrospective programme about women in silent era films. The films which were shown in the retrospective included a restored colour version of the 1921 film Hamlet, starring Asta Nielsen, the 1914 Italian film Cabiria and Berlin Alexanderplatz.

Jury 

The following people were announced as being on the jury for the festival:

International jury
 Paul Schrader, director and screenwriter (United States) - Jury President
 Hiam Abbass, actress and director (Palestine)
 Mario Adorf, actor (Germany)
 Willem Dafoe, actor (United States)
 Gael García Bernal, actor, director and producer (Mexico)
 Nansun Shi, producer (Hong Kong)
 Molly Malene Stensgaard, editor (Denmark)

Best First Feature Award Jury
 Judy Counihan, producer (United Kingdom)
 Niki Karimi, actress (Iran)
 Gerhard Meixner, producer (Germany)

International Short Film Jury
 Peace Anyiam-Fiberesima, producer (Nigeria)
 Riina Sildos, producer (Estonia)
 Ning Ying, director, screenwriter and producer (China)

In competition 
The following films were selected in competition for the Golden Bear and Silver Bear awards:

Key
{| class="wikitable" width="550" colspan="1"
| style="background:#FFDEAD;" align="center"| †
|Winner of the main award for best film in its section
|-
| colspan="2"| The opening and closing films are screened during the opening and closing ceremonies respectively.
|}

Winners

The following awards were presented at the festival.

Golden Bear
The Golden Bear went to Tuya's Marriage by Wang Quan'an.

Silver Bears
 Jury Grand Prix (Grand Prize of the Jury): Ariel Rotter for El otro
 Best Director: Joseph Cedar for Beaufort
 Best Actor: Julio Chávez for El otro
 Best Actress: Nina Hoss for Yella
 Best Music: David Mackenzie for Hallam Foe
 Outstanding Artistic Contribution: For the Ensemble Cast of The Good Shepherd by Robert De Niro
 Alfred Bauer Prize: Park Chan-wook for I'm a Cyborg, But That's OK
 FIPRESCI Award: Obsluhoval jsem anglického krále by Jiří Menzel
 Best First Feature for Vanaja

References

External links
 57th Berlin International Film Festival 2007
 Yearbook for 2007 Berlinale on berlinale.de

Berlin International Film Festival
2007 in Berlin
B
B
2007 in German cinema